Rosa Dominique Noemí Peltier De Liota (born 22 August 1986 in Cochabamba) best known as Dominique Peltier, is a Bolivian beauty queen of Cochabamba who won the Miss Bolivia Universo 2008 title during the Miss Bolivia 2008 pageant on 19 July 2008. She represented her home country Bolivia at the Miss Universe 2009 pageant at the Atlantis Paradise Island, in Nassau, Bahamas on August 23, 2009. Dominique did not enter the 15 semi-finalists. She represented Bolivia in Reina Hispanoamericana 2008 and was placed as a finalist.

References

1986 births
Living people
People from Cochabamba
Bolivian female models
Miss Universe 2009 contestants
Bolivian beauty pageant winners